The  Little League World Series took place between August 22 and August 27 in Williamsport, Pennsylvania. Westbury American Little League of Houston, Texas, defeated American Little League of West New York, New Jersey, in the championship game of the 20th Little League World Series.

Teams

Winners bracket

Consolation bracket

External links
1966 Little League World Series
Line scores for the 1966 LLWS

Little League World Series
Little League World Series
Little League World Series